Verka is a suburb located in the Amritsar district of Punjab state, India. It is located on Batala Road and is situated on the northern part of Amritsar. Post code for Verka town is 143501. The famous milk plant Verka was named after the name of the town in 1973. Verka Railway Station is being electrified.

Attractions

 Sun City Amusement and Water Park
 Gurudwara Nanaksar
 Verka Milk Plant
 Shri Guru Nanak dev Ji Charitable Hospital

Education 
There are many schools and colleges located in Verka for catering the educational needs of students residing in the suburb. They are as follows:
 DAV International School
 Junior Model High School
 Government Senior Secondary School
 Ryan Public School
 Oxford Public School
 Dashmesh Public School
 Har Public School
 Guru Nanak Dev University College
 Anand College of Education for Women
 Global Institute of Technology

Verka Junction railway station 
Verka Junction is Connected To Amritsar, Pathankot and Gurdaspur Directly With passenger as well as Mail/Express Trains. Dera Baba Nanak Route Originates From Verka Junctions, with regular running Dmu's. Amritsar-Pathankot Railway Line in under electrification, which is expected to be completed in 1 year.

[trains to stations] 

1) Pathankot

2) Jammu

3) Katra

4) Dera Baba Nanak

5) Amritsar

6) Bathinda

[Mail/Express Trains]

1)Jammu tawi-Rourkela Express

2)Jammu tawi-Sambhalpur Express

3)Katra-Ahmedabad Weekly Express

4)Delhi-Pathankot Superfast Express

5)Jammi tawi-Bathinda-Veraval-Ahmedabad Somnath Express

6)Ravi Express

References

 https://www.google.com.au/search?q=verka+amritsar+map&oq=verka+amritsar+map&aqs=chrome..69i57.6757j0j8&sourceid=chrome&ie=UTF-8
 https://www.google.com.au/search?q=verka+dairy+amritsar&tbm=isch&tbo=u&source=univ&sa=X&ved=0ahUKEwij2MqAiqDSAhUGNJQKHWPsCUEQsAQISA&biw=1366&bih=638

Amritsar
Neighbourhoods in Punjab, India